Marius Trygg (born 1 June 1976 in Norway) is a Norwegian ice hockey forward. He is currently playing for  Manglerud Star in GET-ligaen.

Career

Early career
He started his senior career with Spektrum Flyers in 1994 and played two seasons before signing with Manglerud Star in 1996. He stayed there for three seasons, before moving abroad.

Moving abroad
In 1999 he signed with the Swedish Elitserien club Färjestad and won the Swedish Championship with them in 2002. He played there for four seasons, before getting signed by Hammarby in HockeyAllsvenskan. He played there only one season before he transferred to Nybro Vikings in the same league. He played another single season in Sweden, before moving to Germany and ETC Crimmitschau.

Back home
In 2006, Trygg moved home to Norway and signed for Stavanger Oilers, winning the Norwegian Championship in 2010.

Personal life
His twin brother, Mats Trygg, also plays ice hockey, as well as their younger brother Mathias.

External links

1976 births
Living people
Norwegian twins
Twin sportspeople
ETC Crimmitschau players
Färjestad BK players
Hammarby Hockey (1921–2008) players
Lørenskog IK players
Manglerud Star Ishockey players
Norwegian expatriate ice hockey people
Norwegian expatriate sportspeople in Sweden
Norwegian expatriate sportspeople in Germany
Norwegian ice hockey forwards
Nybro Vikings players
Spektrum Flyers players
Stavanger Oilers players
Ice hockey people from Oslo